Phyllonorycter sexnotella is a moth of the family Gracillariidae. It is known from Kentucky and Pennsylvania in the United States.

The wingspan is 7-7.5 mm.

References

sexnotella
Moths of North America
Moths described in 1880